Emerson Township may refer to one of the following places in the United States:

 Emerson Township, Columbia County, Arkansas, in Columbia County, Arkansas
 Emerson Township, Michigan
 Emerson Township, Dixon County, Nebraska
 Emerson Township, Harlan County, Nebraska
 Emerson Township, Faulk County, South Dakota, in Faulk County, South Dakota

Township name disambiguation pages